Cadia was an American Christian pop group composed of long-time best friends Courtney Myers and Tori Smith. They both went to school at Christ Presbyterian Academy. Their name, Cadia, is derived from the Greek word Arcadia, meaning place of peace, symbolizing the peace found when fears, insecurities, and trials are released.

The group's debut album includes a song written by Nichole Nordeman called "Inside/Out", which was chosen as the official theme song for Women of Faith's Revolve Tour in 2007.

Myers is the older sister of Carolyne Myers from the Christian pop group pureNRG.

Discography

Cadia (2008)
 "Trust in Me Now"
 "I'll Stay"
 "Safe Place to Fall"
 "This One's for the Girls"
 "Shadowfeet"
 "Jesus"
 "Only a Prayer Away"
 "Speak"
 "Radiate"
 "Curious"
 "Inside/Out"

References

External links
 
Extended Information
Review of Cadia from the Phantom Tollbooth

American Christian musical groups
Christian pop groups
Fervent Records artists
Musical groups established in 2006